Idrisovo (İźris) is a rural locality (a village) in Shafranovsky Selsoviet, Alsheyevsky District, Bashkortostan, Russia. The population was 389 as of 2010. There are 10 streets.

Geography 
Idrisovo is located 10 km southwest of Rayevsky (the district's administrative centre) by road. Uvarovka is the nearest rural locality.

References 

Rural localities in Alsheyevsky District